Correctional Services Corporation (CSC), originally Esmor Correctional Corporation, was a correctional firm founded by James F. Slattery in 1987. It was located in Sarasota, Florida, USA, and traded on the NASDAQ (NASDAQ NMS:CSCQ).  It had been a corporation specializing in the privatization of correctional facilities for federal, state, and local agencies housing adults, juveniles, and Department Of Homeland Security prisoners.

Much of the CSC's profits were allegedly based on high crime rates, as hinted in a 2002 statement by James F. Slattery: "Increases in parole rates combined with economic slowdowns traditionally lead to an increased need for correctional services," he said. "We believe this historical pattern will be repeated, and its effect felt in 2002 and beyond."

Correctional Services Corp. received a $300,000 fine for buying votes in the state legislature, issued by the New York State Lobbying Commission.

In 2005, CSC was sold to GEO Group for $62.1 million. GEO then divested the youth portion of the enterprise, Youth Services International (YSI), back to its principals. According to a 2013 HuffPost investigation, inmates held in facilities run by YSI "have frequently faced beatings, neglect, sexual abuse and unsanitary food over the past two decades."

Due to audits findings of overcharges and reports of continuing abuse, the State of Florida cancelled its existing contracts with YSI, the remaining functional operation of CSC. The corporation was required to reimburse the state for $2,000,000 in overcharges.

Principals
 Chairman: Stuart M. Gerson
 President & Chief Executive: James F. Slattery

See also
Correctional Services Corporation v. Malesko

References

Companies based in Sarasota, Florida
Companies established in 1987
Private prisons in the United States
GEO Group
2005 mergers and acquisitions